ETB 4 is the fourth television channel from the Euskal Irrati Telebista group in the Basque Autonomous Community  and the French Basque Country in Spain. The channel broadcasts in Basque and Spanish.

History
In 2007 ETB announced the launch of ETB4, a channel in Basque and Spanish that would be dedicated to information and culture, in a similar way to La 2 and El 33, however, the financial crisis that broke out in the same year meant that the project was discarded. Instead of ETB 4, ETBK Sat was programmed, the new interim channel combined sports broadcasts with programs from ETB 1 and ETB 2 that were broadcast on ETB Sat.

ETB 4 was launched on October 29, 2014, replacing ETBK Sat on the Basque Country without there being a previous announcement of the change of identity of the channel.

Programming
ETB 4 programming is based on entertainment, highlighting fiction, sports and reruns of ETB 1 and ETB 2 programs.

References

EITB
Basque-language television stations
Television stations in Spain
Television channels and stations established in 2014
Spanish-language television stations